The Gruppo Assicurativo Poste Vita is an Italian company of the Italian Post Group, made up of Poste Vita and Poste Assicura, that works in the insurance industry. Posta Vita also had a minority interests in Europa Gestioni Immobiliari (45%), which the parent company hold another 55%.

According to a research of Ricerche e Studi (a subsidiary of Mediobanca), Poste Vita Insurance Group was the 4th largest insurances company in Italy by gross premiums, according to 2014 data. Another research by PricewaterhouseCoopers, shown the insurer was ranked 2nd by market share in life insurance (14.0%), but not in the top 5 in non-life insurance.

References

External links
 

Insurance companies of Italy
Government-owned companies of Italy
Partly privatized companies of Italy